ISO 3166-2:ML is the entry for Mali in ISO 3166-2, part of the ISO 3166 standard published by the International Organization for Standardization (ISO), which defines codes for the names of the principal subdivisions (e.g., provinces or states) of all countries coded in ISO 3166-1.

Currently for Mali, ISO 3166-2 codes are defined for 1 district and 10 regions. The district Bamako is the capital of the country and has special status equal to the regions.

Each code consists of two parts, separated by a hyphen. The second part is either of the following:
 three letters: district
 1 or 2 digits (1–10): regions

The codes for the regions are assigned roughly from west to east.

Current codes
Subdivision names are listed as in the ISO 3166-2 standard published by the ISO 3166 Maintenance Agency (ISO 3166/MA).

Click on the button in the header to sort each column.

See also
 Subdivisions of Mali
 FIPS region codes of Mali

External links
 ISO Online Browsing Platform: ML
 Regions of Mali, Statoids.com

2:ML
ISO 3166-2
Mali geography-related lists